Peter Thomas McGuigan (December 29, 1942 – December 8, 2017) was a Canadian historian and freelance writer.

Born in Halifax, Nova Scotia, a son of the late James and Stella McGuigan and a distant relative of James Charles McGuigan, McGuigan graduated from Dalhousie and Saint Mary's universities, and held a master's degree in Atlantic Canada Studies.

Career
McGuigan researched and wrote about Irish immigrant communities of the 19th century in Nova Scotia. He wrote a column called Looking Back about the evolution of Halifax's south end for the Southender magazine and a heritage column in The Chronicle Herald. McGuigan was also a long-time contributor and vendor to a local newspaper: Street Feat: The Voice of the Poor.

McGuigan's last book, The Intrigues of Archbishop John T. McNally and the Rise of Saint Mary’s University, is "a truly fascinating and unique chronicle, mixing biography, local heritage, and institutional history in equal parts". McGuigan was working on a new book about the historic Halifax Poor House at the time of his death after a brief battle with cancer.

Publications
The Irish (Peoples of the Maritimes), 1991, Four East Publications
Historic South End Halifax, 2007, Nimbus Publishing
The Intrigues of Archbishop John T. McNally and the Rise of Saint Mary’s University 2012, Fernwood Publishing

References 

1942 births
2017 deaths
20th-century Canadian historians
Deaths from cancer in Nova Scotia
Writers from Halifax, Nova Scotia